The Baytown Outlaws is a 2012 action comedy film directed by Barry Battles in his directorial debut, and written by Battles and Griffin Hood. The film stars Andre Braugher, Clayne Crawford, Daniel Cudmore, Travis Fimmel, Eva Longoria, Paul Wesley, and Billy Bob Thornton. The film follows the Oodie brothers - 
Brick, Lincoln and McQueen - who act as vigilante killers for the local sheriff. When the trio accept a job to rescue a young boy from his godfather, plans quickly fall apart as the brothers aim to deliver the boy to safety while pursued by groups of assassins.

Plot
In Alabama, Oodie brothers Brick, Lincoln and McQueen work as vigilantes for the man who raised them, Sheriff Henry Millard; they bypass the legal system to murder criminals, keeping the crime rate the lowest in the state. After one of their assaults, they are approached by Celeste, a witness to the incident, who offers them $25,000 to rescue her godson Rob and kill his godfather and captor, the drug lord Carlos. The trio accept. Meanwhile, ATF agent Anthony Reese approaches Millard about the spree of criminal deaths and his suspects; the Oodie brothers. Millard is intentionally obstructive to Reese's request for aid.

The Oodies travel to Carlos' home and assault the building, killing Carlos's men but failing to kill Carlos. They recover Rob; a young disabled man in a wheelchair. Carlos sends a group of female biker assassins after them. The bikers find the brothers resting at a bar. The bikers seduce the unaware brothers, separating them from each other, but when Lincoln notices one of them wheeling Rob away, the women attack them. The brothers manage to kill the women and recover Rob, but the massacre ends up on the news with sketches of the three brothers provided by the bar owner, giving Reese the evidence he needs that the Oodies are killers. Brick calls Celeste to find out why the simple job now involves assassins; Celeste confesses that Rob was from a wealthy family that were killed by Carlos so that he, as Rob's legal guardian, could obtain a large trust fund that Rob is to inherit on his impending 18th birthday. Brick makes a further call to Millard who tells them that because of Reese's evidence, he has to disavow them and will arrest them if they return to Alabama.

Though he cannot speak to them, the brothers bond with Rob. McQueen suggests they quit the job, but Brick tells McQueen that they once had a brother like Rob that was regularly beaten by their father until one day he woke up and the brother was gone; the resemblance makes Brick reluctant to let Carlos retake Rob. Another group of assassins in an armored vehicle attack the brothers on the road and snatch Rob from the moving car. The brothers give chase and Lincoln leaps onto the vehicle, singlehandedly slaughtering everyone inside, but he is badly injured and the brothers' car is broken. While walking down the road, the group are picked up by a passing van; one of the passengers is a nurse and tends to Lincoln's wounds but he remains weakened. The group is dropped off in Vicksburg, Mississippi where they wait for Celeste and prepare for further attacks.

Reese discovers a photo of Millard recovering the brothers as children after their father's death, and large cash withdrawals he suspects were used to pay the brothers. He confronts Millard with the evidence and forces him to give up the brothers location for a lesser jail sentence; Millard goes with Reese. A Native American gang arrives and attacks, leaving Brick and McQueen to defend Rob and Lincoln. Celeste later arrives and joins the brothers. They manage to kill most of the gang and Lincoln recovers enough to stop one of them from taking Rob, but Celeste and Brick are downed and the remaining gang member attempts to scalp McQueen; he is shot by Millard. Millard and the brothers are arrested; the brothers provide a false story that does not involve Celeste, allowing her to take care of Rob. Reese's success is rewarded with a transfer to manage the territory; much to his chagrin. Carlos is killed by an explosive package sent by Celeste. 57 months later, the brothers are freed from jail.  They receive a letter from Celeste, enclosing their promised $25,000 payment, with a new truck waiting for them courtesy of Rob.  Celeste ends the letter by saying that others could use their help.

Cast

 Andre Braugher as Sheriff Henry Millard
 Clayne Crawford as Brick Oodie
 Daniel Cudmore as Lincoln "The Dixie Reaper" Oodie
 Travis Fimmel as McQueen Oodie
 Eva Longoria as Celeste Martin
 Paul Wesley as ATF Agent Anthony Reese, an ATF agent.
 Billy Bob Thornton as Carlos Lyman
 Thomas Sangster as Rob, a young disabled man and the target of the Oodie's rescue job. 
 Zoë Bell as Rose
 Serinda Swan as "Jez"
 Arden Cho as Angel
 Brea Grant as Pammy
 Agnes Bruckner as Mona
 Damien Moses as Montane
 Nito Larioza as Tucker
 Bill Perkins as Mewes
 Quinn Early as "Smoke"
 Keith Woulard as Diggs
 Tim J. Smith as Rondo
 Sam Medina as Chogan
 J. LaRose as Helaku
 John Paul Shellnut as Marty
 Julio Oscar Mechoso as "Padre"
 Javier Carrasquillo as Sal
 Griffin Hood as "Dirt" Beggley
 John McConnell as Representative Hawkins
 Ritchie Montgomery as Officer Brown
 J.D. Evermore as Officer Boyd
 Michael Rapaport as "Lucky", a bar owner. 
 James DuMont as ATF Special Agent Simmons
 Natalie Martinez as Ariana, an illegal immigrant and nurse.

Production
Filming began in May, 2011 near New Orleans, Louisiana.

Releases
The Baytown Outlaws was released in the UK on both DVD and Blu-ray Disc on 26 December 2012 through Universal Pictures UK. The release includes a short behind the scenes documentary with cast and crew as well as the film's trailers.

Soundtrack
Intrada Records released the score by Christopher Young and Kostas Christides on August 18, 2014.

Track listing
 Baytown Outlaws (3:58)
 Sugar Plum Scum (2:54)
 Longorioso (3:11)
 Brthr Fckr (4:13)
 When You Wish Upon A Guitar (3:16)
 Two Pistol Coffin (5:42)
 She Is My Shining Island Nympho (4:14)
 Shellac Eyes (2:10)
 Ode To Billy Bob (4:05)
 Lay Me Down On Cold Ground (3:42)
 Bob-A-Lo Babe (3:10)
 Fandango Mango (4:27)
 Searley Insane (3:30)
 Romeo + Juliet Red and Black (3:05)

Reviews
The film opened to mixed reviews.  The sense was that the movie was made to capture the essence of a Robert Rodriguez or Quentin Tarantino styled movie, "but not as good," and "it has neither the stamina nor the wit to go the distance." Yet, it was deemed entertaining nonetheless.
On review aggregator website Rotten Tomatoes, the film holds an approval rating of 22% based on 27 reviews, with an average rating of 4.13/10.

References

External links 
 

2012 films
American action comedy films
2012 action comedy films
Films scored by Christopher Young
Films shot in Louisiana
Films produced by Robert Teitel
2012 directorial debut films
Bureau of Alcohol, Tobacco, Firearms and Explosives in fiction
2010s English-language films
2010s American films